FSV Hollenbach is a German association football club from district of Hollenbach in Mulfingen, Baden-Württemberg. The team was founded in 1970 and first came to attention when the support of local sports clothing manufacturer Jako helped them win promotion to the Verbandsliga Württemberg (VI) in 2007. After fifth and third place results over the next two seasons, FSV captured the division title and advanced to the Oberliga Baden-Württemberg (V).



Honours
The club's honours:
 Verbandsliga Württemberg (VI)
 Champions: 2010
 Landesliga Württemberg I (VI)
 Champions: 2007
 Bezirksliga Hohenlohe (VII)
 Champions: 2000

Recent seasons
The recent season-by-season performance of the club:

 With the introduction of the Regionalligas in 1994 and the 3. Liga in 2008 as the new third tier, below the 2. Bundesliga, all leagues below dropped one tier.

References

External links
Official team site 
FSV Hollenbach profile at Weltfussball.de 
Das deutsche Fußball-Archiv historical German domestic league tables 

Football clubs in Germany
Football clubs in Baden-Württemberg
Association football clubs established in 1970
1970 establishments in West Germany